Estadio José Martin Olaeta is a multi-use stadium in Rosario, Argentina.  It is currently used mostly for football matches and is the home stadium of Argentino de Rosario.  The stadium holds 6,800 people.

External links
Stadium information 

Jose Maria Olaeta